Thom Hell (born 19 March 1976) is a Norwegian singer-songwriter. His birth name is Thomas Helland. He has released several EPs, albums, and singles. After using his backing band "The Love Connection" (Bjarte Jørgensen, Frank Hammersland, Marte Wulff, Jørn Raknes and Vidar Ersfjord) on the two first albums and the following tours, he then formed a new backing band consisting of different people from the Norwegian music scene (Even Ormestad, Thomas Aslaksen, Kjetil Grande, Asbjørn Ribe)

Hell also contributes on Norwegian singer-songwriter Marit Larsen's album Under the Surface where he joins Larsen in a duet for the song "To an End".

Biography
Thom released 2 EPs and 2 albums before being asked by Marit Larsen to be in her band. He also contributed to her first solo album. After leaving her band, he went on to release his critically acclaimed album "God If I Saw Her Now", for which he received two Norwegian Grammys. His next album "All Good Things" went on to win another one for best male artist of the year. Went to LA to record  "Suddenly Past" in 2012. It was produced by the talented Jason Falkner. Recorded and released "Six" in 2014, and "Until This Blows Over" on the Voices of Wonder label in 2015.

Thom is continues to work on his own albums, while producing other artists in his spare time.

Discography

Albums

Compilation albums

EPs
2003: "Tremendous Sinner" (EP)
2004: The While Your Waiting (EP)
2004: I Love You Too (bonus EP to a limited edition of the I Love You album)

Singles
2003: "Missing Home"
2004: "Mourning Song"
2004: "Some Guy"
2006: "Try"
2008: "Don´t Let Go"
2008: "Darling"
2008: "Don´t Leave Me Heather"
2010: "Over You"
2010: "All Good Things"
2011: "Tonight"
2012: "As Long As"
2012: "She´s Like The Wind"
2015: Time
2015: Everything Is Happening So Fast
2016: 1985
2016: Leave Me To Die
2016: Famous

References

External links
Official website
 Thom Hell at MySPace
Facebook Artist page

Norwegian songwriters
English-language singers from Norway
Living people
1976 births
21st-century Norwegian singers
21st-century Norwegian male singers